Harold Joseph Archambault (September 29, 1936 – May 7, 2007) was an American television actor. He was known for playing the role of "Sparks" in the American science fiction television series Voyage to the Bottom of the Sea.

Life and career 
Whiting was born in Larchmont, New York. He began his career in the 1950s, where Whiting worked as a production assistant on the variety television program The Ed Sullivan Show. Whiting studied acting with Sanford Meisner. In 1959, he appeared in the television series Paradise Kid, in which Whiting said that, "it was a flop". He continued his career, mainly appearing on television, as his credits includes, The Fugitive, Mannix, Land of the Giants, The F.B.I., Star Trek: The Original Series, Joe Forrester, Cannon, Garrison's Gorillas, Run for Your Life, Barnaby Jones and The Bold Ones: The Lawyers.

Later in his career, Whiting co-starred in the science fiction television series Voyage to the Bottom of the Sea, where he played the role of the radio engineer "Sparks". He was hired by creator, Irwin Allen. Whiting then co-starred in the new NBC television series Run, Joe, Run, where he played the role of "Sgt. William Corey".

Death 
Whiting died in May 2007 in Black Mountain, North Carolina, at the age of 70.

References

External links 

Rotten Tomatoes profile

1936 births
2007 deaths
People from Larchmont, New York
Male actors from New York (state)
American male television actors
20th-century American male actors